{{DISPLAYTITLE:C21H26N2O2}}
The molecular formula C21H26N2O2 (molar mass: 338.44 g/mol) may refer to:

 Coronaridine, or 18-carbomethoxyibogamine
 Kopsinine

Molecular formulas